Jacques Herlin (17 August 1927 – 7 June 2014) was a French character actor.

Born in Paris as Jacques de Jouette, he appeared in an impressive number of films from the early sixties.  He was also active on stage and on television. He died in 2014 at the age of 86.

Selected filmography 

 Et ta soeur (1958) - (uncredited)
 Le caïd (1960) - (uncredited)
 Boulevard (1960) - Le garçon de café
 The Girl with the Golden Eyes (1961) - Un chauffeur de taxi
 Carillons sans joie (1962) - Benjouba
 Arsène Lupin contre Arsène Lupin (1962)
 The Day and the Hour (1963)
 Goliath and the Sins of Babylon (1963) - Phoenician Merchant
 The Whip and the Body (1963) - Priest
 I mostri (1963) - Outspoken Juror (segmento "La musa") (uncredited)
 Temple of the White Elephant (1964) - British Officer
 White Voices (1964) - The Friar
 Buffalo Bill, Hero of the Far West (1965) - Piano Player
 Don Camillo in Moscow (1965) - Perletti
 The Dreamer (1965) - Marcello
 Juliet of the Spirits (1965) - Frenchman at Party (uncredited)
 The Mandrake (1965) - Frate Predicatore
 The 10th Victim (1965) - Masoch Club Manager (uncredited)
 Seven Golden Men Strike Again (1966)
 Secret Agent Super Dragon (1966) - Ross
 A Maiden for a Prince (1966) - Il marchese spagnolo
 Yankee (1966) - Filosofo
 For a Few Extra Dollars (1966) - Traitor
 Pardon, Are You For or Against? (1966) - Bergerac
 Non faccio la guerra, faccio l'amore (1966)
 Master Stroke (1967) - Goldsmith (uncredited)
 Ballata da un miliardo (1967)
 The Tiger and the Pussycat (1967) - Monsignore
 Seven Pistols for a Massacre (1967) - Horace Pim
 Tom Dollar (1967) - mr. Osborne
 Matchless (1967) - O-Chin's Doctor
 The Stranger (1967) - Director of Home
 The Girl and the General (1967) - The Veterinary
 Two Faces of the Dollar (1967) - Mathematician
 Your Turn to Die (1967) - Actor at recital
 The Sweet Sins of Sexy Susan (1967) - Count Dulce
 Der Turm der verbotenen Liebe (1968) - König von Frankreich
 Sexy Susan Sins Again (1968) - St. Laduc
 Catch As Catch Can (1968) - Zoology Professor
 House of Pleasure (1969) - Ambassador Bulakieff
 Why Did I Ever Say Yes Twice? (1969) - Dr. Pellegrini
  (1969) - Frederic Joerges
 Giacomo Casanova: Childhood and Adolescence (1969) - Monsieur Alexandre
 Una storia d'amore (1970) - Rucó
 Frau Wirtin bläst auch gern Trompete (1970) - Baron Bierrechalet
 Frau Wirtin treibt es jetzt noch toller (1970) - Vicomte de Champenoise
 Musik, Musik - da wackelt die Penne (1970) - Dr. Wimmer
 Einer spinnt immer (1971) - Dr. Klemm
 Man of the Year (1971) - Prof. Godé
 The Mad Aunts Strike Out (1971) - Eddy Stubenrauch
 Per amore o per forza (1971)
 Außer Rand und Band am Wolfgangsee (1972) - Marcel
 Le mille e una notte all'italiana (1972)
 Slap the Monster on Page One (1972) - Lauri
 The Adventures of Pinocchio (1972) - 2° Dottore
 Il maschio ruspante (1972) - Lawyer - father of Rema
 Dirty Weekend (1973) - TV Journalist
 The Countess Died of Laughter (1973) - Monsieur Dulac
 Blue Blooms the Gentian (1973) - Alfons Ponelli
 Shaft in Africa (1973) - Perreau
 Property Is No Longer a Theft (1973) - Bank Employee
 Das Wandern ist Herrn Müllers Lust (1973) - Timothy
 Massacre in Rome (1973) - Giovanni
 Three Tough Guys (1974) - Barfly
 Tous les chemins mènent à l'homme (1974) - Adhémar
 L'erotomane (1974) - The Surgeon
 Two Missionaries (1974) - The Bishop
 Chi ha rubato il tesoro dello scia? (1974)
 Moses the Lawgiver (1974, TV Mini-Series) - Magician
 Mondo candido (1975) - Dr. Pangloss
 The Diamond Peddlers (1976) - Inspector Nelson
 Il soldato di ventura (1976)
 Plot of Fear (1976) - Pandolfi
 Carioca tigre (1976) - Kibbutz
 Casanova & Co. (1977) - Senator Dell'Acqua
 Three Swedes in Upper Bavaria (1977) - Müller-Meyerfall
 Pane, burro e marmellata (1977) - Dottor Gaetano Arfè - the psychiatrist
 Antonio Gramsci: The Days of Prison (1977) - Lo Santo
 War of the Robots (1978) - Prof. Carr
 Hurra - Die Schwedinnen sind da (1978) - Hugo Wiesinger, Ministerialrat
 Summer Night Fever (1978) - Ludwig
 Love Hotel in Tyrol (1978) - Armin Rübenzahl
 Inn of the Sinful Daughters (1978) - Maxi Huber 'Immobilien-Huber'
 Himmel, Scheich und Wolkenbruch (1979)
 Austern mit Senf (1979)
 Zum Gasthof der spritzigen Mädchen (1979) - Raffaele
  (1979) - Stepan - Stallmeister
 Speed Cross (1980) - Fischer
 I Hate Blondes (1980) - Party Guest
 Three Lederhosen in St. Tropez (1980) - Französischer Polizeichef
 Il Marchese del Grillo (1981) - Rabet
 The Salamander (1981) - Woodpecker
 Piratensender Power Play (1982) - Dr. Eisenhauer
 Die liebestollen Lederhosen (1982) - Hotelportier
 Odd Squad (1982) - French General
 Ironmaster (1983) - Raa the Wise
 Histoire du caporal (1983) - Le père
 Pappa e ciccia (1983) - Herr Schmidt (first story)
 Moon in the Gutter (1983)
 Plem, Plem - Die Schule brennt (1983)
 Happy Weekend (1983)
 Rive droite, rive gauche (1984) - Monsieur Vernakis
 Train d'enfer (1985)
 National Lampoon's European Vacation (1985) - Hotel Desk Clerk
 Funny Boy (1987) - Poum
 Freckled Max and the Spooks (1987) - Igor
 Chouans! (1988) - Le Marquis de St-Gildas
 The Gamble (1988) - Old fiancé of Olivia
 The Little Thief (1988) - Le sacristain
 Rebus (1989) - Albert
 Torrents of Spring (1989) - Pantaleone
 Un père et passe (1989) - Armand
 The Favour, the Watch and the Very Big Fish (1991) - Man with Hook-nose
 Un type bien (1991) - Monsieur Fez
 Krapatchouk (1992) - Travailleur immigré
 Entangled (1993) - Florent
 Justinien Trouvé, ou le bâtard de Dieu (1993)
 Not Everybody's Lucky Enough to Have Communist Parents (1993) - Choumerski
 Jefferson in Paris (1995) - Savant
 Au petit Marguery (1995) - Monsieur Piat
 Animals (1998) - Laurent
 The Creator (1999) - Le Majordome
 The Messenger: The Story of Joan of Arc (1999) - Orleans' Priest
 Off Key (2001) - Cardenal
 Le pharmacien de garde (2003) - M. Jouvin
 7 ans de mariage (2003) - Grand-père Ménard
 L'incruste (2004) - Le grand-père
 Il ne faut jurer... de rien! (2005) - Lafayette
 A Good Year (2006) - Papa Duflot
 Madame Irma (2006) - Mr. Blanchard
 Room of Death (2007) - Marceau
 Hello Goodbye (2008) - L'oncle Albert
 Welcome (2009) - Policier centre de rétention
 In the Beginning (2009) - Gendarme 1
 Of Gods and Men (2010) - Amédée
 Our Day Will Come (2010) - Hervé Clavel
 Monsieur Papa (2011) - Le petit vieux en fauteuil roulant
 Guilty (2011) - Le gendarme
 Farewell, My Queen (2012) - Marquis de Vaucouleurs
 Me and Kaminski (2015) - Dominik Silva
 Furie (2019) - Le juge (final film role)

References

External links 
 

1927 births
2014 deaths
French male film actors
French male television actors
French male stage actors